General Zebulon Pike Lock and Dam No. 11 is a lock and dam located between Dubuque, Iowa, and rural Grant County, Wisconsin, on the Upper Mississippi River.

It was opened to navigation 14 September 1937.

Description

There is also an incomplete auxiliary lock.

The lock and dam are listed on the National Register of Historic Places.

Gallery

See also

Upper Mississippi River National Wildlife and Fish Refuge
Eagle Point Bridge
Sinnipee, Wisconsin
Public Works Administration dams dist

References

External links
Lock and Dam No. 11 - U.S. Army Corps of Engineers (Official site)

USGS.gov: Reach 1, Pool 11
USACE Civil Works Digital Project Notebook

11
11
11
Dams on the Mississippi River
11
Gravity dams
Roller dams
Buildings and structures in Dubuque County, Iowa
Buildings and structures in Grant County, Wisconsin
Historic American Engineering Record in Iowa
Historic American Engineering Record in Wisconsin
Historic districts in Dubuque, Iowa
Historic districts on the National Register of Historic Places in Iowa
National Register of Historic Places in Dubuque, Iowa
Transport infrastructure completed in 1937
Transportation buildings and structures in Dubuque County, Iowa
Driftless Area
Mississippi Valley Division
11
11
11
1937 establishments in Iowa
1937 establishments in Wisconsin